Aziyadé (1879; also known as Constantinople) is a novel by French author Pierre Loti. Originally published anonymously, it was his first book, and along with Le Mariage de Loti (1880, also published anonymously), would introduce the author to the French public and quickly propel him to fame; because of this, his anonymous persona did not last long.

Aziyadé is semi-autobiographical, based on a diary Loti kept during a three-month period as a French Naval officer in Greece and Constantinople (now Istanbul) in the fall and winter of 1876. It tells the story of the 27-year-old Loti's illicit love affair with an 18-year-old "Circassian" harem girl named Aziyadé. Although Aziyadé was one of many conquests in the exotic romantic's life, she was his greatest love, and he would wear a gold ring with her name on it for the rest of his life. Forming a love triangle, the book also describes Loti's "friendship" with a Spanish man servant named Samuel, for which most critics believe, based on Loti's diary entries, that some sort of homosexual affair occurred (indeed some believe Aziyadé never existed and the entire work is a cover for a homosexual love story, however others say the evidence for Aziyadé's existence seems overwhelming, (See Blanch)). It also describes Loti's love affair with Turkish culture which became a central part of his "exotica" persona.

The only known English translation is by Marjorie Laurie which can be found in many editions, no longer in copyright; however, some of the parts have been sanitized regarding harem life, prostitution and homosexuality. The original French first edition is very rare and has become a highly prized collectors item.

Resources
Lesley Blanch (1983). Pierre Loti: the legendary romantic. Chapters 6 to 8. (Republished as Pierre Loti: Travels with the Legendary Romantic. Tauris, 2004. .)
Richard M. Berrong. "Portraying male same-sex desire in nineteenth-century French literature: Pierre Loti's Aziyadé", College Literature, Fall 1998.

1879 French novels
French autobiographical novels
Novels by Pierre Loti
Fiction set in 1876
Novels set in Greece
Novels set in Istanbul
Works published anonymously